The following is a list of squads for each nation competing in men's football at the 2019 African Games in Rabat. Each team had to name a final squad of 18 players (two of whom must be goalkeepers).

The nationality for each club reflects the national association (not the league) to which the club is affiliated. A flag is included for coaches that are of a different nationality than their own national team. Those marked in bold have been capped at full International level.

Group A

Morocco
Head coach: Jamal Salami

The final squad was announced on 12 August 2019.

Burkina Faso
Head coach: Oscar Barro

The preliminary 24-men squad was announced on 2 August 2019.

Nigeria
Head coach: Paul Aigbogun

The final squad was announced on 12 August 2019.

South Africa
Head coach: Helman Mkhalele

The final squad was announced on 15 August 2019.

Group B

Burundi
Head coach: Omar Ntakagero

The 24-man preliminary squad was announced on 1 August 2019.

Ghana
Head coach: Yaw Preko

The final squad was announced on 14 August 2019.

Mali
Head coach: Mamoutou Kané

The final squad was announced on 14 August 2019.

Senegal
Head coach: Youssoupha Dabo

The final squad was announced on 13 August 2019.

References

Football at the 2019 African Games
African Games football squads